Joshua Adler Lowenthal is an American politician from California. A Democrat, Lowenthal is a member of the California State Assembly, representing Long Beach and Carson.

Lowenthal is the son of Bonnie and Alan Lowenthal.

In 2018, Lowenthal ran for the 72nd district in the California State Assembly and lost to Republican Westminster City Councilman Tyler Diep. He ran for the 69th district in 2022, and defeated Long Beach City Councilman Al Austin.

References

Living people
Year of birth missing (living people)